First War may refer to:

 Prehistoric warfare
 First World War (World War I)
 First Civil War (disambiguation)
 First Northern War (various)

Specific conflicts

 First Anglo-Afghan War
 First Anglo-Burmese War
 First Anglo-Dutch War
 First Anglo-Maratha War
 First Anglo-Mysore War
 First Anglo-Sikh War
 First Balkan War
 First Barbary War
 First Barons' War
 First Boer War
 First Carlist War
 First Celtiberian War
 First Chechen War
 First Congo War
 First Dacian War
 First Franco-Dahomean War
 First Goryeo–Khitan War
 First Indochina War
 First Italian War of Independence
 First Italo-Ethiopian War
 First Jewish–Roman War
 First Macedonian War
 First Margrave War
 First Maroon War
 First Matabele War
 First Messenian War
 First Mithridatic War
 First Opium War
 First Peloponnesian War
 First Perso-Turkic War
 First Punic War
 First Sacred War
 First Schleswig War
 First Servile War
 First Sino-Japanese War
 First Taranaki War
 First Turko-Egyptian War
 First War against Napoleon
 First war of Kappel
 First War of Scottish Independence
 First Zhili–Fengtian War

Entertainment
 First War of the World, music album

See also
 
 
 First (disambiguation)
 War (disambiguation)